Following Ayatollah Khomeini's 14 February 1989 death fatwa against author Salman Rushdie, after the publication of Rushdie's novel The Satanic Verses, Yusuf Islam (previously known as Cat Stevens), made statements endorsing the killing of Rushdie. His statements generated criticism from commentators in the West.

In response, Yusuf Islam said that some of his comments were "stupid and offensive jokes" made in "bad taste," while others were merely giving his interpretation of Islamic law but not advocating any action. Islam also said that later in the same programme he promised to accept the judgment of a British court if it found Rushdie innocent of any crime, blasphemy or otherwise.

Statements

Kingston Polytechnic
On 21 February 1989, Yusuf Islam addressed students at Kingston Polytechnic (now Kingston University) in London about his conversion to Islam and was asked about the controversy in the Muslim world and the fatwa calling for Salman Rushdie's execution. He replied, "He must be killed. The Qur'an makes it clear – if someone defames the prophet, then he must die."

Newspapers quickly denounced what was seen as Yusuf Islam's support for the killing of Rushdie and the next day, he released a statement saying that he was not personally encouraging anybody to be a vigilante, and that he was only stating that blasphemy is a capital offence according to the Qur'an.

Hypotheticals
Two months later, Islam appeared on an Australian television programme, ABC's Geoffrey Robertson's Hypotheticals, an occasional broadcast featuring a panel of notable guests to explore a hypothetical situation with moral, ethical and/or political dilemmas. In the episode "A Satanic Scenario", Islam had an exchange about the issue with the moderator and Queen's Counsel Geoffrey Robertson. Islam would later clarify the exchanges as "stupid and offensive jokes" made "in bad taste", but "part of a well-known British national trait ... dry humour on my part."
Robertson: You don't think that this man deserves to die?
Y. Islam: Who, Salman Rushdie?
Robertson: Yes.
Y. Islam: Yes, yes.
Robertson: And do you have a duty to be his executioner?
Y. Islam: Uh, no, not necessarily, unless we were in an Islamic state and I was ordered by a judge or by the authority to carry out such an act – perhaps, yes.
[Some minutes later, Robertson on the subject of a protest where an effigy of the author is to be burned]
Robertson: Would you be part of that protest, Yusuf Islam, would you go to a demonstration where you knew that an effigy was going to be burned?
Y. Islam: I would have hoped that it'd be the real thing.

The New York Times also reports this statement from the programme:  I might ring somebody who might do more damage to him than he would like. I'd try to phone the Ayatollah Khomeini and tell him exactly where this man is.

Later Islam stated the following about his above mentioned comments:

I foolishly made light of certain provocative questions. When asked what I'd do if Salman Rushdie entered a restaurant in which I was eating, I said, "I would probably call up Ayatollah Khomeini"; and, rather than go to a demonstration to burn an effigy of the author, I jokingly said I would have preferred that it'd be the "real thing".

The content of the broadcast was reported in The New York Times on 23 May 1989, a week before the show's intended broadcast. He and other Muslim participants "objected to cuts" that "omitted the Muslim justification for punishment of blasphemy."

According to Islam, his last comments on the innocence of Rushdie were not a joke:
 Providentially, they kept in one important response to a final question posed directly to me by Geoffrey Robertson QC. At the end of the debate he asked me to imagine if Salman Rushdie was taken to court in Britain and the Jury found him 'not guilty' of any crime – blasphemy or otherwise – and dismissed the case, what I would do. I clearly stated that I would have to accept the decision and fully abide by the law! And that was no joke.

Rolling Stone interview
In a 2000 Rolling Stone magazine interview:

 I'm very sad that this seems to be the No. 1 question people want to discuss. I had nothing to do with the issue other than what the media created. I was innocently drawn into the whole controversy. So, after many years, I'm glad at least now that I have been given the opportunity to explain to the public and fans my side of the story in my own words. At a lecture, back in 1989, I was asked a question about blasphemy according to Islamic Law, I simply repeated the legal view according to my limited knowledge of the Scriptural texts, based directly on historical commentaries of the Qur'an. The next day the newspaper headlines read, "Cat Says, Kill Rushdie." I was abhorred, but what could I do? I was a new Muslim. If you ask a Bible student to quote the legal punishment of a person who commits blasphemy in the Bible, he would be dishonest if he didn't mention Leviticus .

Appearance on the BBC's Desert Island Discs
In October 2020, Islam appeared on the BBC's Desert Island Discs and said:
 I was certainly not prepared or equipped to deal with shark-toothed journalists and the whole way in which the media spins stories. I was cleverly framed, I would say, by certain questions, where I couldn’t for instance rewrite the 10 Commandments. You can’t expect me to do that. At the same time I never actually ever supported the fatwa. I even wrote a whole press statement which, very early on, which the press ignored – completely ignored. They went for the one which was written by the journalist who originally wrote the story. And so I had to live through that.

Personal website
On his personal spiritual website he wrote:
I never called for the death of Salman Rushdie; nor backed the Fatwa issued by the Ayatollah Khomeini—and still don’t. The book itself destroyed the harmony between peoples and created an unnecessary international crisis.

When asked about my opinion regarding blasphemy, I could not tell a lie and confirmed that – like both the Torah and the Gospel – the Qur'an considers it, without repentance, as a capital offense. The Bible is full of similar harsh laws if you're looking for them. However, the application of such Biblical and Qur'anic injunctions is not to be outside of due process of law, in a place or land where such law is accepted and applied by the society as a whole...

Criticism and backlash
Islam's comments caused a backlash at the time. The pop group 10,000 Maniacs deleted the Cat Stevens song "Peace Train", which they had recorded for their 1987 In My Tribe album, from subsequent pressings of the album as a protest against Islam's remarks. Several US stations stopped playing Cat Stevens records. Radio talk show host Tom Leykis of KFI-AM in Los Angeles called for a mass burning of Cat Stevens' records, later changed to a mass steamrolling. Islam claimed that he had earlier unsuccessfully asked his record company to stop production of his Cat Stevens records but they had refused on economic grounds.

Commenting on the controversy regarding the United States government's 2004 refusal to allow Islam to enter the country, Middle East scholar Juan Cole criticised him, saying that he "never forgave him [Stevens] for advocating the execution of Salman Rushdie," and claiming he had "later explained this position away by saying that he did not endorse vigilante action against Rushdie, but would rather want the verdict to be carried out by a proper court."

Rushdie himself, in a 2007 letter to the editor of The Daily Telegraph, complained of what he believed was Islam's attempts to "rewrite his past," and called his claims of innocence "rubbish." In November 2010, in an interview on George Stroumboulopoulos Tonight on CBC Television Rushdie was asked about Islam's appearance at Jon Stewart and Stephen Colbert's Rally to Restore Sanity and/or Fear in Washington, D.C. the previous month. He said, "I thought it was a mistake to have invited him and I actually called up Jon Stewart and we had a couple of conversations and I think, you know, by the end of it I think he's pretty clear that it was probably a misstep. Because he's not a good guy. It may be that he once sang 'Peace Train'... but he hasn't been Cat Stevens for a long time, you know. He's a different guy now."

At a 2012 fundraiser, Stewart recalled that phone conversation with Rushdie, who expressed disappointment that a performer was used "who wanted to kill me." Stewart said he was unaware of Islam's 1989 comments at the time. "So I'm like, I'm sure he doesn't believe that people should be put to death for apostasy," Stewart recalled. "I said, 'look, I'm sorry you're upset, but I'm sure the guy isn't really like that. Let me talk to him." Islam said the whole thing was a "misunderstanding", but added "although why do you have to insult the Prophet?" Stewart continued "We get into a whole conversation, and it becomes very clear to me that he is straddling two worlds in a very difficult way, and it broke my heart a little bit. I wish I had known that, I wouldn't have done [the routine], I don't think, because that to me is a deal breaker. Death for free speech is a deal breaker."

In the 23 April 2014, episode of The Daily Show, Stewart stated unequivocally that inviting Islam was a "mistake" and that he "should have looked into it more."

Soon after Stewart made those comments, The Atlantic reviewed the "long war" between Rushdie and Islam in brief, including reference to Stanford literary blogger Cynthia Haven's chronicle of "the entire thing, including a bizarre and apparently ongoing side-conflict involving YouTube videos and copyright complaints" and more response by Rushdie to the Islam appearance.

Alleged resemblance to character in the novel
Some commentators have concluded that the character "Bilal X" in Rushdie's book is a caricature of Yusuf Islam. The fictional character Bilal X, a successful African-American former pop singer who has converted to Islam, is portrayed by Rushdie as the "favoured lieutenant" of "the Imam", a character based on the Shia Ayatollah Ruhollah Khomeini. Bilal X's "well-nourished, highly trained" voice serves as "a weapon of the West turned against its makers."

See also
The Satanic Verses controversy

References 

Islam-related controversies
Events relating to freedom of expression
Comments About Salman Rushdie
Salman Rushdie
Islam in the United Kingdom